Rail Europe, SAS is global technology company that specializes in providing train tickets and rail passes for travel in Europe. 

The company has a long history dating back to the 1920s and was built on the idea to make train travel in Europe more accessible to international travelers. The company was a pioneer in sustainability mobility in Europe, and it quickly became a reference brand in the European rail travel market.  

The company is headquartered in Paris, France, and has a customer call center located in Mumbai, India, ISO 9001:2008 certified,.  The company has subsidiaries in London, UK, Melbourne, Australia; Mumbai, India, Shanghai, China, and Florida, US.  

Rail Europe offers a wide range of international high-speed train tickets including Eurostar, TGV, Italo, and Le Frecce. Tickets for local and regional trains in Europe are also available.

The company sells around 2.5 million European train tickets every year. Its catalogue of products focuses on European train operators such as SNCF, SBB, Eurostar, Thalys, Trenitalia, Italo, DB, Renfe, ÖBB, SNCB, NS, OUIGO Spain and National Rail, and rail passes including the Swiss Travel Pass and Eurail Passes.

These innovative products and services, combined with the company's commitment to customer service and its extensive network of partners, have helped Rail Europe to maintain its position as a leading provider of European rail travel.

History
Rail Europe is doing business in North America since the 1930s. The French national rail operator (SNCF), along with its Swiss counterpart (CFF/SBB) and the Deutsche Reichsbahn, had representatives in the United States in the 1930s. Those operations were later subsumed into Rail Europe, Inc. in North America. In 1959, the company introduced the Eurail Pass to the North American market.

The Rail Europe office in Rosemont near Chicago had its origins in the German Railways' representation in North America. 

The company expanded into Australasia in 1995. In the early 2000s, it continued to grow with representation in South America and South Africa, culminating in a new customer support team in Mumbai, India in 2010.

Rail Europe grew internationally by acquiring Rail Plus in Australia and New Zealand in 2016 and British train booking platform Loco2.com in 2017. Rail Europe became the international business unit of e.Voyageurs SNCF and No.1 distributor of train tickets and passes.

In March 2022, Rail Europe SAS became a private-owned company, no longer part of e.Voyageurs SNCF. Today, the Rail Europe experts provide tech service solutions to +15,000 travel professionals in 70 countries, making it one of the most comprehensive providers of European rail travel on the market.

Products and services
Rail Europe has built strong partnerships with many of the major train operators in Europe, giving customers access to a wide range of trains and routes.

European travel products offered by Rail Europe were shaped around a 'catalog' of opportunities, for both B2C and B2C clients, ranging from Europe-HiSpeed to lesser services like Rhine Valley Train and Bavarian Castles and various EuroCity services. A dedicated Rail Europe team maintained this 'catalog' for many decades. 

 Rail Passes - One of the company's most popular products is the Eurail pass, which allows travelers to explore up to 28 European countries by train. The pass comes in various options, including a global pass for unlimited travel and one-country passes for specific countries. In addition, Rail Europe also offers city-to-city train tickets, which allow travelers to travel between specific destinations without the need for a rail pass.
 Train Tickets - for one-way or round-trip train journeys from city-centre to city-centre. These paper tickets were in the main TCV tickets, which in the 1980s were reasonably priced, but by 2000 were no longer a viable option, having been undercut by the fares available on European rail operators' own websites.
 Print at home e-tickets for a limited number of city pairs.
 Seat Reservations - mandatory for high-speed trains in France and Spain and made available to rail pass holders at "passholder" rates.
 Sleeping Accommodation, viz. couchettes and sleeping berths  - available on some overnight trains.
 High-speed trains such as Thalys or Eurostar. 
 Sightseeing Tours
 Group Fares: Rail Europe is well-known for its quality services for group travelers. The company offers a wide range of options for groups of all sizes, from small groups of friends and family to large corporate and school groups. The company has a dedicated team of group travel specialists who work with customers to plan and book group trips. They help groups with everything from itinerary planning and booking train tickets to arranging accommodation and other travel services. This ensures that group travelers have a smooth and hassle-free experience.

Easy Rail Access 
In 2019, Rail Europe launched Easy Rail Access (ERA), a technology platform for travel industry partners. 
Accessible via a web browser, it provides offers, customer service support, access to real-time European railway inventories, booking tools and processes for agents.

References

American travel websites
International rail transport
Travel and holiday companies of the United States